Kiến Giang is a township in Lệ Thủy District, Quảng Bình Province, in the North Central Coast region of Vietnam. This township is located on the banks of the Kiến Giang River. The township is the capital of the district. The township's main economic activities is commerce and services for the surrounding rural areas. This township is 3 km south of families of Võ Nguyên Giáp, Ngo Dinh Diem and Nguyễn Hữu Cảnh, Dương Văn An, famous persons in the history of Vietnam. The township has an area of 4.4km2, population of 6,246. The town is prone to flooding due to its position in a low plain created by Kiến Giang river.

References

Communes of Quảng Bình province
Populated places in Quảng Bình province
District capitals in Vietnam
Townships in Vietnam